Homocysteine  is a non-proteinogenic α-amino acid. It is a homologue of the amino acid cysteine, differing by an additional methylene bridge (-CH2-). It is biosynthesized from methionine by the removal of its terminal Cε methyl group. In the body, homocysteine can be recycled into methionine or converted into cysteine with the aid of certain B-vitamins.

High levels of homocysteine in the blood (hyperhomocysteinemia) is regarded as a marker of cardiovascular disease, likely working through atherogenesis, which can result in ischemic injury. Therefore, hyperhomocysteinemia is a possible risk factor for coronary artery disease. Coronary artery disease occurs when an atherosclerotic plaque blocks blood flow to the coronary arteries, which supply the heart with oxygenated blood. 

Hyperhomocysteinemia has been correlated with the occurrence of blood clots, heart attacks, and strokes, although it is unclear whether hyperhomocysteinemia is an independent risk factor for these conditions. Hyperhomocysteinemia also has been associated with early-term spontaneous abortions and with neural tube defects.

Structure 

Homocysteine exists at neutral pH values as a zwitterion.

Biosynthesis and biochemical roles

Homocysteine is biosynthesized naturally via a multi-step process. First, methionine receives an adenosine group from ATP, a reaction catalyzed by S-adenosyl-methionine synthetase, to give S-adenosyl methionine (SAM-e). SAM-e then transfers the methyl group to an acceptor molecule, (e.g., norepinephrine as an acceptor during epinephrine synthesis, DNA methyltransferase as an intermediate acceptor in the process of DNA methylation). The adenosine is then hydrolyzed to yield L-homocysteine. L-Homocysteine has two primary fates: conversion via tetrahydrofolate (THF) back into L-methionine or conversion to L-cysteine.

Biosynthesis of cysteine
Mammals biosynthesize the amino acid cysteine via homocysteine. Cystathionine β-synthase catalyses the condensation of homocysteine and serine to give cystathionine. This reaction uses pyridoxine (vitamin B6) as a cofactor. Cystathionine γ-lyase then converts this double amino acid to cysteine, ammonia, and α-ketobutyrate. Bacteria and plants rely on a different pathway to produce cysteine, relying on O-acetylserine.

Methionine salvage
Homocysteine can be recycled into methionine. This process uses N5-methyl tetrahydrofolate as the methyl donor and cobalamin (vitamin B12)-related enzymes. More detail on these enzymes can be found in the article for methionine synthase.

Other reactions of biochemical significance
Homocysteine can cyclize to give homocysteine thiolactone, a five-membered heterocycle.  Because of this "self-looping" reaction, homocysteine-containing peptides tend to cleave themselves by reactions generating oxidative stress.

Homocysteine also acts as an allosteric antagonist at Dopamine D2 receptors. 

It has been proposed that both homocysteine and its thiolactone may have played a significant role in the appearance of life on the early Earth.

Homocysteine levels

Homocysteine levels typically are higher in men than women, and increase with age.

Common levels in Western populations are 10 to 12 μmol/L, and levels of 20 μmol/L are found in populations with low B-vitamin intakes or in the elderly (e.g., Rotterdam, Framingham).  

It is decreased with methyl folate trapping, where it is accompanied by decreased methylmalonic acid, increased folate, and a decrease in formiminoglutamic acid. This is the opposite of MTHFR C677T mutations, which result in an increase in homocysteine.

The ranges above are provided as examples only; test results always should be interpreted using the range provided by the laboratory that produced the result.

Elevated homocysteine

Abnormally high levels of homocysteine in the serum, above 15 μmol/L, are a medical condition called hyperhomocysteinemia. This has been claimed to be a significant risk factor for the development of a wide range of diseases, including thrombosis, neuropsychiatric illness, and fractures. It also is found to be associated with microalbuminuria, which is a strong indicator of the risk of future cardiovascular disease and renal dysfunction. Vitamin B12 deficiency, when coupled with high serum folate levels, has been found to increase overall homocysteine concentrations as well.

Typically, hyperhomocysteinemia is managed with vitamin B6, vitamin B9, and vitamin B12 supplementation. However, supplementation with these vitamins does not appear to improve cardiovascular disease outcomes.

References

External links

 Homocysteine MS Spectrum
 Homocysteine at Lab Tests Online
 Homocysteine: analyte monograph - The Association for Clinical Biochemistry and Laboratory Medicine
Prof. David Spence on homocysteine levels, kidney damage, and cardiovascular disease, The Health Report, Radio National, 24 May 2010

Sulfur amino acids
Thiols
Non-proteinogenic amino acids
Excitatory amino acids